The 2000 Chicago Marathon was the 23rd running of the annual marathon race in Chicago, United States and was held on October 22. The elite men's race was won by Morocco's Khalid Khannouchi in a time of 2:07:01 hours and the women's race was won by Kenya's Catherine Ndereba in 2:21:33.

Results

Men

Women

References

Results. Association of Road Racing Statisticians. Retrieved 2020-04-10.

External links 
 Official website

Chicago Marathon
Chicago
2000 in Illinois
2000s in Chicago
Chicago Marathon
Chicago Marathon